For the Wales international footballer see Andrew Crofts (footballer)

Andrew Crofts (born 1953) based in England, is a ghostwriter. Many of his subjects have been international and have topped the best-seller charts of United Kingdom and other countries. Because of the secrecy surrounding the business of ghostwriting it is never known exactly how many books that have been credited to other people were actually written by him, but in recent years more and more publishers seem to be insisting on placing his name alongside the "author's" in order to boost sales. In 2014 he published a memoir "Confessions of a Ghostwriter" (published by Friday Project). Although the book is filled with anecdotes about the ghostwriting profession the Daily Telegraph noted that "when it comes to famous clients, he is as silent as Jeeves".

Early days and development of his career
Born in 1953 in England, Crofts was educated at Lancing College, a school renowned for producing writers, (Evelyn Waugh, Tom Sharpe, Jan Morris, David Hare, Christopher Hampton and Tim Rice).

Moving to London at 17, Crofts took a variety of jobs as he struggled to establish himself as a freelance writer, (including a stint running a modelling agency in London's Bond Street), while submitting work to every kind of magazine and publisher. For a number of years he worked as a freelance business journalist and then a travel writer, spending a great deal of his time in the Far East, the Caribbean and the South Pacific. His career as a ghostwriter seems to have started seriously in the early 1990s.

In 2006 his name was openly linked to a book by the popular winner of Big Brother, Pete Bennett, who wrote movingly about his childhood and the problems of having Tourette syndrome in Pete-My Story (HarperCollins).

In 2007 thriller writer Robert Harris quoted Crofts's ghostwriting book at the start of every chapter of his bestselling The Ghost. The book was subsequently filmed by Roman Polanski with Ewan McGregor playing the ghostwriter. Crofts, in turn, has commented that The Ghost was "a gift from the gods. Harris did us all a huge favour."

Crofts' ghostwriting career has involved writing for dictators, politicians, arms dealers and billionaires, and visits to palaces and tax havens in Monaco and Bermuda. His experiences led to Secrets of the Italian Gardner, a novel set inside a dictator's palace during the Arab Spring, narrated by the dictator's ghostwriter. The same ghostwriter features in a second novel by Crofts, 'What Lies Around Us', this time becoming embroiled in the American celebrity political scene when paid a million dollars by a Silicon Valley billionaire to ghost the autobiography of a Hollywood superstar.

Crofts' fees are substantial, reputed to average six figures. He has stated that because a ghostwriter has no need to invent plots or do lengthy research, "it is perfectly feasible to produce four books a year."

Known ghosted titles
 Sold by Zana Muhsen, (Time Warner), about two sisters sold as child brides in the Yemen and was France's best selling non-fiction book of the year at the time of publication, with close to four million copies now sold worldwide.
 The Little Prisoner by Jane Elliott, (HarperCollins), a tale of child abuse which went to number one in the Sunday Times charts both as a hardback and a paperback, selling half a million copies within a few months.
 Betrayed by Lyndsey Harris, (Arrow), the story of a little girl who was cruelly framed for crimes she never committed by the person she trusted the most. Winner of the Richard and Judy "True" competition.
 The Kid by Kevin Lewis (Penguin), (topped The Sunday Times charts).
 Just a Boy by Richard McCann (Ebury), (topped The Sunday Times charts).
 For a House Made of Stone for Gina French (Vision), a girl who started life in the Philippine mountains and ended up on trial for murder in England via the bars of Manila and ex-pat life in Brunei.
 Heroine of the Desert by Donya Al-Nahi, (Metro), who fought to reunite mothers with their children in international tug-of-love wars.
 Through Gypsy Eyes for Kathy Etchingham, (Gollancz), who was Jimi Hendrix's girlfriend.
 Kathy and Me for actress and soap star Gillian Taylforth.
  Pete: My Story for Pete Bennett, an acute Tourette's sufferer.
 Please Daddy No for Stuart Howarth, (HarperCollins).
 My Family is All I Have for Helen-Alice Dear (Ebury Press), an English woman who was trapped behind the Iron Curtain for 50 years.
 A promise to Nadia by Zana Muhsen, the follow-up of Sold, in which is told how Zana struggles to get her sister free.
 Daddy's Little Earner by Maria Landon, (HarperCollins), about a girl growing up with a violent and manipulative father, who sexually abuses her and later forces her into prostitution; and her eventual escape.

Authored books
 Confessions of a Ghostwriter, (The Friday Project) - an anecdotal memoir of ghostwriting and the publishing industry.
 Secrets of the Italian Gardener The story of a ghostwriter, set inside the palace of a dictator about to be overthrown in the Arab Spring
 The Little Hero (Vision), which tells the story of Iqbal Masih, a child slave who escaped and became a campaigner for the abolition of bonded labour in Pakistan before being assassinated at the age of 13
 Maisie's Amazing Maids (Stratus) – a light hearted novel about a ghostwriter
 The Freelance Writer's Handbook, (Piatkus Books)
 Ghostwriting (A&C Black)
 The Change Agent – How to create a wonderful world (Tonto Books) - the story of James Martin, noted futurist and benefactor of the Oxford James-Martin school, and Croft's visit to Martin's private island in Bermuda. 
 The Overnight Fame of Steffi McBride (Blake)
 The Fabulous Dreams of Maggie de Beer (Smashwords and Kindle)

Controversy
Pete Bennett caused some controversy at the time of publication by cheerfully admitting to a Guardian journalist that he had not even read the book he was supposed to have written.
Rumours have circulated about other controversial titles and how much or little input Crofts might have had in their creation, particularly since Robert Harris's book The Ghost, was widely presumed to be about Tony Blair, who has always stated that he did not use a ghostwriter for his own autobiography.

Through his blog Crofts has also been a vocal champion of electronic publishing for authors and traditional self publishing for those who need their books published privately. He was one of the first ghostwriters to launch his own website. In 2012 he joined the Management Committee of the Society of Authors.

References

External links 
 Official website

Living people
1953 births
20th-century British novelists
21st-century British novelists
People educated at Lancing College
British male novelists
20th-century British male writers
21st-century British male writers